Lineage selection occurs when the frequency of one biological lineage changes relative to another lineage. Lineage selection is a generalization of individual based natural selection; the stating that an allele is favored by natural selection is equivalent to stating that the lineage bearing the allele is favored by natural selection. For alleles with simple positive or negative fitness effects, lineage and individual based selection are equivalent. However, lineage selection can accommodate a wider array of evolutionary phenomena, such as the adaptive evolution of evolvability, altruism, and recombination. Additionally, lineage selection is useful in determining the effects of mutations in highly structured environments such as tumors.

References

 
Altruism